The Grans Magatzems Pyrénées (Pyrénées Hyper Centre), also known as Pyrénées Andorra, Pyrénées Department Store or just 'Pyrénées, is a major department store situated in Andorra la Vella, in Andorra. The company has been a member of the International Association of Department Stores from 1979 to 2019.

References

External links

Companies of Andorra
Department stores of Andorra